Fletcher is an unincorporated community in Jackson County, West Virginia, United States.

The community was named after one Mr. Fletcher, an early settler.

References 

Unincorporated communities in West Virginia
Unincorporated communities in Jackson County, West Virginia